Yumakovo (Yomaq) is a rural locality (a village) in Zirgansky Selsoviet, Meleuzovsky District, Bashkortostan, Russia. The population was 176 as of 2010. There are 4 streets.

Geography 
Yumakovo is located 35 km north of Meleuz (the district's administrative centre) by road. Klimovka is the nearest rural locality.

References 

Rural localities in Meleuzovsky District